Hergest (pronounced with a hard g) may refer to:

 Lower Hergest, a hamlet in Herefordshire, England
 Upper Hergest, a hamlet in Herefordshire, England

See also
 Hergest Ridge, a hill on the border between England and Wales
 Hergest Ridge (album), a 1974 album by Mike Oldfield
 Red Book of Hergest, a medieval Welsh manuscript once kept at Hergest Court
 White Book of Hergest, a medieval Welsh manuscript, now lost